Liu Wanlong (born July 1962) is a lieutenant general in the People's Liberation Army of China. He is a member of the 19th Central Committee of the Chinese Communist Party.

Biography
Liu was born in Dongchangfu District, Liaocheng, Shandong, in July 1962. He was commander of Ali Military District in February 2008 and commander of Nanjiang Military District in 2011. He became head of the Military Department of Xinjiang Production and Construction Corps in 2013. On 17 March 2014, he was appointed commander of Gansu Military District, succeeding . In June 2016, he was admitted to member of the Standing Committee of the CCP Gansu Provincial Committee, the province's top authority. He became commander of Xinjiang Military District in January 2017, and served until April 2021.

He was promoted to the rank of major general (Shaojiang) in December 2012 and lieutenant general (zhongjiang) in July 2018.

References

1962 births
Living people
People from Liaocheng
People's Liberation Army generals from Shandong
Members of the 19th Central Committee of the Chinese Communist Party